Rineloricaria strigilata, commonly known as the Santa Cruz whiptail catfish, is a species of catfish in the family Loricariidae. It is native to South America, where it is known from southern Brazil and Uruguay, with its type locality being listed as the Lagoa dos Patos basin near Santa Cruz do Sul. It is typically found in environments with slow to fast water flow, clear to brown water, and a substrate composed of sand or mud. The species reaches 13.9 cm (5.5 inches) in standard length and is believed to be a facultative air-breather.

References 

Loricariini

Fish described in 1868
Catfish of South America
Freshwater fish of Brazil
Fish of Uruguay